The BET Award for Album of the Year is given to the most popular album released the same or previous year of the year the awards are handed out. The award is only given to the headlining artist(s) or group of the album. Beyoncé received three nominations in this category, the most for any artist, including a nomination with her husband Jay-Z as the supergroup THE CARTERS.

Winners and nominees
Winners are listed first and highlighted in bold.

2010s

2020s

Multiple wins and nominations

Nominations
 3 nominations
 Beyoncé (including credit as The Carters)

 2 nominations
 Kendrick Lamar
 Jay-Z (including credit as The Carters)
 DaBaby
 Megan Thee Stallion
 Bruno Mars (including credit as Silk Sonic)
 H.E.R.
 Jazmine Sullivan

References

Awards established in 2017
BET Awards
Album awards